The 1910 Swarthmore Quakers football team was an American football team that represented Swarthmore College as an independent during the 1910 college football season. The team compiled a 5–3 record and outscored opponents by a total of 144 to 59. George H. Brooke was the head coach.

Schedule

References

Swarthmore
Swarthmore Garnet Tide football seasons
Swarthmore Quakers football